John Vesey (died 1554) was bishop of Exeter.

John Vesey may also refer to:
 John Vesey (archbishop of Tuam) (1638–1716), Church of Ireland clergyman
 John Vesey, 1st Baron Knapton (died 1761), Anglo-Irish politician and peer
 John Vesey, 2nd Viscount de Vesci (1771–1855), Anglo-Irish politician and peer
 John Vesey, 4th Viscount de Vesci (1844–1903), Anglo-Irish peer and British Army officer
 John Vesey, 6th Viscount de Vesci (1919–1983)